Mafla is a surname. Notable people with the surname include:

Carina Vance Mafla (born 1977), Ecuadorian politician
Christian Mafla (born 1993), Colombian footballer
Edison Mafla (born 1974), Colombian footballer
Víctor Hugo Mafla (born 1974), Colombian footballer

See also
Malla (surname)